Native Window is the only album of American progressive rock band Native Window. It was released on June 23, 2009. The tracks on the album are all original material composed by the members of the band. The album came about soon after the band formed; it was because Steve Walsh, the lead singer for Kansas, would not write any new material. Phil Ehart, Rich Williams, Billy Greer and David Ragsdale got together to write new songs, and released them under the Native Window name. The song "An Ocean Away" was originally released by Billy Greer's band Seventh Key on their 2004 album The Raging Fire.

Track listing

References

2009 debut albums
Inside Out Music albums